John Taylor, D.D. (6 July 1711 – 29 August 1772) was an English priest.

Taylor was born in Kiddington, and matriculated at Christ Church, Oxford, in 1730; he graduated M.A. in 1743, B. & D.D. in 1752. He was Archdeacon of Bedford from 1745 until 1756, and Archdeacon of Leicester from then until his death at Salisbury.

Notes 

1772 deaths
Alumni of Christ Church, Oxford
Archdeacons of Leicester
18th-century English people
18th-century English Anglican priests
1711 births
People from Oxfordshire